James Peter Phillips (born 20 September 1989) is an English footballer who plays as a midfielder for Kidsgrove Athletic.

Career

Stoke City
He started his career at Stoke City but after loan spells at Alfreton Town
and Stafford Rangers
he was released at the end of the 2008–09 season.
It was then that he was snapped up by Burton manager Paul Peschisolido.

Burton Albion
He made his debut on the first day of the 2009–10 season, starting in the 3–1 defeat to Shrewsbury Town.
He scored his first goal for Burton in a first round League Cup defeat at Reading on 11 August 2009. He scored his first Football League goal in a 2–1 win over Grimsby Town on 10 October 2009. His goal turned out to be the winning goal for Burton. He scored his second league goal for the club, 4 years after his first, in a 2–0 win over Torquay United on 22 October 2013. His fourth goal for the club came against Bournemouth in the FA Cup on 14 January 2014.

On 27 March, Phillips was loaned out to Conference Premier side Alfreton Town until the end of the season. He played five times for Alfreton as they suffered relegation to the Conference North. Phillips was released by Burton at the end of the 2014–15 season.

Gateshead
Phillips joined National League side Gateshead on 7 July 2015 on a one-year contract. He made his debut on 8 August in a 2–1 win over Aldershot Town and scored his first goal on 12 September in a 2–1 win over Eastleigh.

On 17 February 2016, Phillips joined Macclesfield Town on a one-month loan. Phillips made three appearances for Macclesfield Town before joining Altrincham on loan for the remainder of the season on 18 March 2016.

On 3 May 2016, it was announced that Phillips had been released by Gateshead. He remained without club until August 2017, where he joined Mickleover Sports. He played for the club until the summer 2019, where he joined Kidsgrove Athletic.

Career statistics

References

External links

1989 births
Living people
Footballers from Stoke-on-Trent
Association football midfielders
English footballers
Alfreton Town F.C. players
Altrincham F.C. players
Burton Albion F.C. players
Gateshead F.C. players
Macclesfield Town F.C. players
Stafford Rangers F.C. players
Mickleover Sports F.C. players
Kidsgrove Athletic F.C. players
English Football League players
National League (English football) players